Itumuta is one of the seven districts on the island of Rotuma, a dependency of Fiji. It includes the villages of Maftoa and Lopo.

References

Districts of Rotuma